Thaika Ahmad Abdul Qadir  (2 October 1891 – 14 February 1976) was a South Indian Islamic scholar, spiritual guide, and Mufti. He was a key figure in acquiring government accreditation for many Arabic Colleges and Madrasas in Tamil Nadu. His life-long contributions were recognised by his contemporaries with a felicitation function on 20 September 1967.

Education
Ahmad Abdul Qadir spent his early childhood in the company of his paternal grandfather, Imam al-'Arus Sayyid Muhammad, who died when he was seven years old. He then received religious instruction from his father Sahib al-Jalwa Shahul Hamid (d. 1921) and his paternal uncle Sahib al-Khalwa Abdul Qadir (d. 1913) at the Arusiyya Seminary. During this period, he also memorized the whole Qur'an.

Following this, he continued his studies at Al-Baqiyat As-Salihat Seminary in Vellore. Here he was under the guidance of the seminary's founder, Shah Abdul Wahab, who was impressed by his ability in studies. Upon graduation at Vellore, he went to An-Nur Al-Muhammadiyya Seminary in Podakkudi where he acquainted with the seminary's founder Abdul Karim.

Career
Following a short stint at the business incorporated by his late paternal grandfather, he returned to the Arusiyya Seminary where he spent the rest of his life teaching and issuing religious edicts. He inaugurated the Uswatun Hasana Association in Kilakarai through which he managed mosques and coordinated social work in the town and surrounding areas in the Ramanathapuram district.

He inherited the mantle of the Arusi-Qadiri Tariqa and played the role of a spiritual guide to its adherents. He headed the various Masjids, Madrasas, Maktabs, Tekkes and associations related to the Arusi-Qadiri around the world.

Achievements
He was instrumental in acquiring government accreditation for many Arabic Colleges and Madrasas in Tamil Nadu and was actively involved in the setting up of many schools in South India. In his last days, there were more than 300 Madrasas and Maktabs under his guidance within the Ramanathapuram district.

Felicitation function
On 20 September 1967, Ahmad Abdul Qadir's services to Islam and humanity was commemorated with a felicitation function in Madurai. It coincided with the 80th Hijri year of his birth. Quaid-e-Millat Muhammad Ismail, Quaid al-Qawm Sayyid Abdur Rahman Bafaqi Thangal, A. K. A. Abdul Samad, Hazrat Ziauddeen (Principal, Arabic College, Podakkudi), Hazrat Rahmatullah (Principal, Arabic College, Nidur) were some of the dignitaries who attended the function.

Dr. T. P. Meenakshisundaram, Vice Chancellor of Madurai University, released a 370-page souvenir in honour of Ahmad Abdul Qadir at the function. It was a life montage of Ahmad Abdul Qadir in Tamil and English prose, together with greetings from luminaries around the world.

Death
Ahmad Abdul Qadir passed away after the dawn prayers on Saturday, 14 February 1976, corresponding to the Hijri date 13 Safar 1369. The following day, in the presence of family, friends and disciples, his funeral prayer was led by his younger son, Dr Thaika Shuaib. He was laid to rest at the Arusiyya Tekke. Funeral prayers in absentia were held elsewhere in India, Sri Lanka and the Far East.

See also

Arusiyyah Madrasah
Arwi or Arabic-Tamil
Tamil Muslim
Imamul Aroos
Thaika Shuaib
Qadiriyya
Shafi'i
Sufism

References

Further reading

External links
Arusi Qadiri Sufi Path - Biographies of the Arusi Qadiri spiritual masters.

1891 births
1976 deaths
Tamil Sufis
20th-century Muslim scholars of Islam
20th-century Muslim theologians
Qadiri order
Scholars of Sufism
Indian Sufi religious leaders
Sunni Sufis